Hantumerútbuorren is a hamlet in Noardeast-Fryslân in the province of Friesland, the Netherlands. It had a population of around 67 January 2017. Before 2019, the village was part of the Dongeradeel municipality.

The village was first mentioned in 1511 as Berum, and means "neighbourhood near Hantum". In 1840, it was home to 109 people.

References

External links

Noardeast-Fryslân
Populated places in Friesland